Suna East is a constituency in Kenya. It is one of eight constituencies in Migori County. It was established in 2013 when Migori Constituency was divided into Suna West and Suna East.

Members of Parliament

References 

Constituencies in Migori County
2013 establishments in Kenya
Constituencies established in 2013